"Underneath the Arches" is a 1932 popular song with words and music by Bud Flanagan, and additional lyrics by Reg Connelly. It was one of the most famous songs of the duo Flanagan and Allen.

According to a television programme broadcast in 1957, Bud Flanagan said that he wrote the song in Derby in 1927, and first performed it a week later at the Pier Pavilion, Southport. It refers to the arches of Derby's  Friargate Railway Bridge and to the street homeless men who slept there during the Great Depression.

Singing Sculpture
The Flanagan and Allen recording was used as part of the performance art piece The Singing Sculpture, by artists Gilbert & George, premiered in 1969.  The artists stood on a table, their hands and heads covered in multi-coloured metallic powder, and sang along with the recording while they moved.  At times the performance would last for a day.

Covers

The song has also been covered by Connee Boswell, Primo Scala, the Andrews Sisters, and Andy Russell in the United States. A well-known version in the United Kingdom was made by Max Bygraves. A sequel to the song, Where the Arches Used To Be, was sung by Flanagan and Allen in the film A Fire Has Been Arranged in which the arches are knocked down and flats built in their place.

The Primo Scala recording, with the Keynotes, was released by London Records as catalog number 238. The record first reached the Billboard charts on August 6, 1948, and lasted 16 weeks on the chart, peaking at No. 6.

The Andrews Sisters' recording was released by Decca Records as catalog number 24490 (the flip side of their recording of You Call Everybody Darlin'). The record first reached the Billboard  charts on August 27, 1948, and lasted 10 weeks on the chart, peaking at No. 10.

The Andy Russell recording was released by Capitol Records as catalog number 15183. The record first reached the Billboard charts on October 1, 1948, and lasted 5 weeks on the chart, peaking at No. 21.

In 1968 Australian pop singer, Johnny Farnham, covered the track, as his second single, which reached No. 6 on the Go-Set National Top 40 Singles Chart. In 1970 the artist duo Gilbert & George performed the song in Nigel Greenwood Gallery, which launched their career as "singing and living sculptures".

The song is used in the television mini-series A Perfect Spy, based on the John le Carré novel, while father and son (the key figures) are running under arches near a British beach. It was also the signature tune for the Radio London Underneath the Arches programme.

See also
Pub song
Underneath the Arches, arranged by Robert McAnally (1959)

References

1932 songs
Great Depression songs
Flanagan and Allen songs